"Do Something to Me" is a song written by Jimmy Calvert, Norman Marzano, and Paul Naumann and was recorded by Tommy James and the Shondells for their 1968 album, Crimson & Clover.

Reception
"Do Something to Me" reached #38 on the Billboard Hot 100 in 1968. The song also reached #16 in Canada.

Cover versions
? & the Mysterians released the original version in August 1967 that reached #110 on the US chart. It was the last single for the band on the Cameo-Parkway Records label. Jimmy Wisner arranged the music for the song.
The Pooh Sticks released a version of the song in 1988 on their album,  Orgasm.

References

1968 songs
1968 singles
Tommy James and the Shondells songs
? and the Mysterians songs
Roulette Records singles
Cameo-Parkway Records singles